Cameron Peterson (born 4 December 1983) is an Australian professional racing cyclist who rides for Drapac.

References

External links

1983 births
Living people
Australian male cyclists
Place of birth missing (living people)